Ahmed Afif (born 6 January 1967) is a Seychellois politician and banker. He serves as the Vice President of Seychelles since 27 October 2020.

Biography

Ahmed Afif was born in Mahé in the Seychelles as the son Abdulla Afif, and is of Maldivian descent; his father was the President of the United Suvadive Republic from 1959 to 1963. Afif graduated from Warwick University in Maths, Operational Research, Statistics and Economics. He had served as chairman of NouvoBanq Seychelles and Seychelles Savings Bank.

He was first elected to the National Assembly in 2006 for the Anse Etoile Constituency. In 2015, he joined the Seychellois Alliance as the running mate of Patrick Pillay in the 2015 presidential election. In 2016, the Seychellois Alliance joined Linyon Demokratik Seselwa for the 2016 election. In 2018, Afif was elected the Deputy Speaker of Seychelles' National Assembly.

On 27 October 2020, after the LDS won the 2020 Seychellois general election, Afif was sworn in as Vice-President. On 4 November 2020, the portfolios of Information and Information Communication Technology  were assigned to Afif.

References

1967 births
Living people
Government ministers of Seychelles
Vice-presidents of Seychelles
Seychellois economists
Seychellois people of Maldivian descent
Alumni of the University of Warwick
People from Mahé, Seychelles